The rhinoceros hornbill (Buceros rhinoceros) is a large species of forest hornbill (Bucerotidae). In captivity it can live for up to 35 years. It is found in lowland and montane, tropical and subtropical climates and in mountain rain forests up to 1,400 metres in Borneo, Sumatra, Java, the Malay Peninsula, Singapore, and southern Thailand.

The rhinoceros hornbill is the state bird of the Malaysian state of Sarawak and the country's national bird. Some Dayak people, especially the Ibanic groups, believe it to be the chief of worldly birds or the supreme worldly bird, and its statue is used to welcome the god of the augural birds, Sengalang Burong, to the feasts and celebrations of humankind. Contrary to some misunderstandings, the rhinoceros hornbill does not represent their war god, who is represented in this world by the brahminy kite. It is featured on the reverse of the 5 Malaysian ringgit bill.

Taxonomy
The rhinoceros hornbill was formally described by the Swedish naturalist Carl Linnaeus in 1758 in the tenth edition of his Systema Naturae. He placed it with the great hornbill in the genus Buceros and coined the binomial name Buceros rhinoceros. Linnaeus specified the location as China. The genus name is from Latin becerus meaning "horned like an ox" which in turn is from the Ancient Greek boukerōs  which combines bous meaning "ox" with kerōs meaning "horn". The specific rhinoceros is Latin for "rhinoceros".

Three subspecies are recognised:
 B. r. borneoensis Schlegel & Müller, S, 1845 – Borneo
 B. r. rhinoceros Linnaeus, 1758 – south Malay Peninsula and Sumatra
 B. r. silvestris Vieillot, 1816 – Java

Description

The plumage is predominantly black, with white legs and vent and a white tail with a black band. The huge bill and casque are orange and red, the colour coming from preen oil rubbed on from the preen gland above the tail. The eyes of the male are red with black rims, and white with red rims in the female.

Behaviour

Diet and feeding

The diet of the rhinoceros hornbill is dominated by fruit, but it will take any insect, small reptile, rodent, and smaller birds that it can catch.

Breeding

The courtship and bonding of these birds are critical, as the female must trust the male to provide her with everything when she is incubating and raising chicks. These hornbills make their nests inside tree trunks, and the female stays inside with the eggs and then with the chicks, while the male brings them food. After the eggs are laid, the male collects mud, and the pair pack that mud, along with food and feces, to wall up the entrance to the tree cavity. They leave a very small hole, just large enough for the male to feed the female, and later the chicks, and for the female to defecate through the hole. Once the chicks are fully feathered and old enough to leave the nest, the parents chip away the dry mud to let the chicks out.

Status and conservation
The rhinoceros hornbill faces a number of threats, including loss of its rainforest habitat, as well as hunting for its meat, and its skull and feathers. Habitat destruction has led to the loss of the large trees the species requires for breeding, which in turn makes it easier for poachers to find the rhinoceros hornbill. It is frequently shot at by poachers due to confusion with the highly sought-after helmeted hornbill. Due to this, the species was uplisted to vulnerable from near threatened on the IUCN Red List in 2018.

Gallery

References

External links

 Downloadable audio file of the sounds of the rhinoceros hornbill
 BBC Radio Programme concerning Hornbills, featuring a section focusing on the Rhinoceros Hornbill, including calls

rhinoceros hornbill
rhinoceros hornbill
Birds of Malesia
rhinoceros hornbill
Fauna of the Borneo montane rain forests
rhinoceros hornbill